Jalan Panching, Federal Route 1488, is a federal road in Pahang, Malaysia.

At most sections, the Federal Route 1488 was built under the JKR R5 road standard, with a speed limit of 90 km/h.

List of junctions

Malaysian Federal Roads